Kris Ward (born November 20, 1979) is an American soccer coach. He was most recently the head coach of the Washington Spirit in the National Women's Soccer League (NWSL).

Coaching career
Ward re-joined Washington Spirit as an assistant coach in August 2020. After the Spirit's former head coach Richie Burke was suspended in August 2021, Ward served as acting head coach for the rest of the 2021 NWSL season and led the team to an NWSL Championship. In December 2021, Ward was named the permanent head coach. 

On August 22, 2022, with the team holding a  record and on 12 points, second-fewest in the NWSL, the Spirit announced that Ward had been relieved of his duties with six games remaining in the season.

Coaching honors
Washington Spirit
 NWSL Championship: 2021

References

External links
 
 LinkedIn profile

1979 births
Living people
Union University alumni
Washington Spirit coaches
Washington Freedom non-playing staff
St. Mary's Seahawks
American soccer coaches
National Women's Soccer League coaches